Tini Tom is an Indian actor, comedian and mimicry artist from Kerala. He works in Malayalam films and television.

Early life
Tini was born in North Paravoor, Kerala, India. His father Tomy T.D. is an engineer. He has a sister Tincy. Tom completed his high school education from St. Albert's High School, Ernakulam and his pre-degree course at St. Albert's College, Ernakulam, and degree in politics from Maharaja's College, Ernakulam. He enrolled for L.L.B at Ramamanohar Lohia College of Law, Bangalore, but discontinued. He has a karate blue belt.

Career
Tini Tom started his career as an impressionist and has worked with famous troupes such as Seven Arts, Cochin Guinness and Kalabhavan, which saw him going places. His appearance in a TV comedy programme called Tom & Jerry with Guinness Pakru, became a success. This programme helped both the artists gain entry into commercial films. Tini Tom made his big-screen debut with Panchapandavar (1998) but it was through the Mammootty-starrer Pattalam that he gained some notice. He got his career break with Ranjith's Mammootty-starrer Pranchiyettan & the Saint in which he portrayed the role of a driver. His effective use of Thrissur-slang of Malayalam language earned him high praise.

His roles as the expensive land dealer in Indian Rupee, the noticeable character in Beautiful and the bartender in Spirit gave him a place in the forefront of Malayalam cinema. He is also a permanent judge in Vodafone Comedy Stars, a comedy reality show on Asianet.

He acted as the body double of Mammootty for the dual roles in Annan Thampi and Ee Pattanathil Bhootham and triple-role in Paleri Manikyam: Oru Pathirakolapathakathinte Katha.

He acted in the 2013 Malayalam Film Housefull in a leading role for the first time in his acting career, in which he portrayed the role of a 36-year-old police constable who experienced multiple failures at trying to find a woman to marry and at last after marriage as a result of fertility treatments the couple got four kids in a single delivery. Jyothirmayi was the actress who portrayed the role of Tini Tom's wife.

Two Malayalam films namely Green Apple and Odum Raja Aadum Rani are completed in which he is playing the lead role. Tom's film Daffadar has been completed in 2016. He won the 2017 Critics Award and Abu memorial award for best actor. He was elected A.M.M.A. (Association of Malayalam Movie Artists) executive member. Tini Tom is now in Guinness Book of World Records as host and judge for doing the comedy show Utsavam in Flowers TV continuously twelve hours without break and for the TV live telecast.

Personal life
He is married to Roopa and they have a son. He resides in Aluva with his family, their house is named Eden.

Awards 
2014 Asianet Film Awards for Best supporting actor film Vellimoonga.
2017 Kerala Film Critics Awards for Best supporting actor film Dafedar.
2017 AT Abu Memorial award for Best actor film [[Dafedar).               *2022 kerala vision  special jury award for different movies includes (signature,pappan,19aam nootandu )

Filmography

Films

All films are in Malayalam language unless otherwise noted.

Television
Cinemala (Asianet)
Tom and Jerry (Asianet)
Savari Giri Giri (Surya TV)
Five Star Thattukada (Asianet)
comedy stars (Asianet) as Judge
Sundari niyum Sundaran njnanum (Asianet) as Judge
Comedy Masters(Amrita TV) as Host
Comedy Utsavam Season 3(Flowers TV) as Judge
top singer Season 2(Flowers TV) AS Judge
John Jaffer Janardhan (Surya TV) as MLA
Veendum Chila Veetuviseshangal (Asianet) as Host
Comedy Mamakam (Asianet) as Host
Comedy Stars (season 3) (Asianet) as Judge
Top Singer (season 2) (Flowers TV)

References

External links
 

Living people
Indian male film actors
Indian male television actors
Male actors in Malayalam cinema
Male actors from Kochi
Maharaja's College, Ernakulam alumni
Male actors in Malayalam television
20th-century Indian male actors
21st-century Indian male actors
1972 births